Kathryn Elizabeth "Katie" Rood (born 2 September 1992) is a New Zealand professional footballer who currently plays for Hearts in Scottish Women's Premier League and the New Zealand national team.

Club career

Rood developed into a consistent goalscorer in her regional league for Glenfield Rovers and for Northern Football in the National Women's League.

In 2012 Rood spent a period with Lincoln Ladies of the FA WSL, and she made a substitute appearance against Doncaster Belles. She signed for newly formed Italian Serie A club Juventus in August 2017, after a successful trial. She made six appearances, scoring four goals and left after the season.  Rood then signed for FA WSL Bristol City in the summer of 2018. Following a move to the South Coast, Rood played for Southampton FC Women, promoted in the 2021–22 season to the FA Women's Championship.

International career

Rood played two games for New Zealand U20 during the 2012 FIFA U-20 Women's World Cup campaign. Rood played her first senior international for New Zealand women's national team in September 2017, a 5–0 defeat by the United States at Nippert Stadium, Cincinnati.

International goals

References

External links
 
 
 

1992 births
New Zealand women's association footballers
New Zealand expatriate sportspeople in Italy
New Zealand expatriate sportspeople in Scotland
Women's Super League players
Expatriate women's footballers in Italy
Expatriate women's footballers in England
Living people
Serie A (women's football) players
Juventus F.C. (women) players
Bristol City W.F.C. players
New Zealand expatriate women's association footballers
Women's association football forwards
Lewes F.C. Women players
New Zealand women's international footballers
Expatriate women's footballers in Scotland
New Zealand expatriate sportspeople in England
Footballers from Middlesbrough
Heart of Midlothian W.F.C. players
Scottish Women's Premier League players
Southampton F.C. Women players